Spacestation Gaming (also referred to as SSG) is a multi-regional professional esports organization based out of Utah founded and owned by social media influencer Shaun "Shonduras" McBride. Since its founding, SSG has grown to include teams in eight different leagues and is active in esports content creation. They won the Rainbow Six Siege world championship in 2020.

History

Founding (2017) 
SSG began with the sponsorship of a Smite Pro League team in 2017, as McBride was a fan of the game. Shortly after entering the esports arena, SSG added PlayerUnknown's Battlegrounds (PUBG) and Brawlhalla teams to bring diversity to their roster.

2018 
In March 2018, SSG introduced its new Rainbow Six and Rocket League rosters. On April 27, SSG announced a strategic partnership with the NBA's Utah Jazz, designed to foster collaboration and growth within the two Utah-based organizations. That same month the organization also entered the Battlerite competitive scene with players Averse, Bloom, and Proster joining their roster. This team went on to win the Battlerite Pro League at Dreamhack.  In June, SSG announced its partnership with Uber Eats - a first for Uber Eats in eSports. On September 12, SSG announced its new partnership with gaming chair provider Vertagear to sell a custom SSG-branded chair.

2019 
SSG entered 2019 with the announcement of their joining the Paladins Premier League. SSG also debuted its complete team of Rainbow Six players and creators, hoping to further integrate with the gaming community. Shortly after this announcement, the team placed in the top ten at The Six Invitational, 2019. The first SSG Apex Legends team was also announced and competed at the X-Games. In March, SSG announced their PUBG Mobile team, and soon after announced an updated 2019 Rocket League roster. This Rocket League team went on to compete in the Rocket League Season 8 Worlds. Sypical, a member of that team, was awarded Regular Season MVP for the 8th season of the RLCS.

SSG announced a brand partnership with Champion in April, released in Foot Locker stores across the United States. This partnership later grew into a full-fledged partnership, with additional SSG merchandise released by the brand. In August, SSG announced their first Brawl Stars roster, with additional rosters in other regions like Brazil and Southeast Asia announced in the following months. In October, SSG announced its partnership with mobile creators Powerbang and Clash With Ash. This partnership would see the development of new business ventures and new relationships with the mobile community. On October 15, SSG officially exited the PUBG Esports scene, citing non-existent communication, lack of feedback, and support from the league. SSG made their entry into Smash Bros Ultimate in November with the signing of LeoN, while the organization's first Trackmania racer, Matt, joined the organization in early December as their racer in the new Trackmania Grand League. On December 15, the SSG Rainbow Six: Siege team took first place at the US National championship, earning the title of Team USA. The SSG Rocket League team also competed in Madrid for the RLCS World Championship, taking third place.

2020 
The SSG Rainbow Six: Siege team continued their winning streak on February 17, winning the Six Invitational in Montreal, making them World Champions and earning $1 million. The championship was the first time in over three years that a North American team won a major tournament in the league. On March 2, SSG further cemented their departure from PUBG by officially releasing their mobile roster,  giving the same reasons for their exit as they had in October 2019. After months of speculation, SSG officially acquired the Clash Royale roster of Blast Off Gaming on May 16. SSG then revealed their player lineup of Samuel Bassotto, thegod_rf, ah craaaap, & LaPoKaTi, with Trainer Luis as team director.

Soon after this announcement, SSG revealed that they had also signed the World of Warcraft Arena team known formerly as The Boys and would compete in the Arena World Championship in the North American region.

On April 4, SSG expanded into iRacing by announcing their partnership with NASCAR drivers Will Rodgers and Chase Cabre, competing under the banner of SSG in events like the NASCAR Coca-Cola iRacing Series and special invitational events during the COVID-19 pandemic.

On August 24, SSG announced four out of five members of their VALORANT roster consisting of roca, insky, kaplan, and sSef to perform in a future Riot Games esport planned for its game. SSG's Rocket League team won the Fall North American Rocket League Major held October 18 to 25. On November 23, AimLab and SSG announced their official partnership with their Rainbow 6, VALORANT, and future FPS Teams.

Throughout 2020, SSG had active rosters in Rainbow Six: Siege, Rocket League, VALORANT, Smash Ultimate, Smite Pro League, Trackmania Grand League, iRacing, Clash Royale League, and World of Warcraft.

2021 
March 27 marked SSG's re-entry to Apex Legends with a team of Claraphii, Frexs, and Xenialstaken. In May, The SSG Rainbow Six: Siege team got into the Six Invitational 2021 Group Stage. Canadian came out of retirement to join the team in Paris due to passport issues with stand-in player Luke. The team made it into the playoffs but lost their first match in the lower bracket, eliminating them from the tournament. SSG then signed Matthew "Hotancold" Stevens on June 4 after SSG needed an in-game leader to replace Canadian. On June 2, 2021, SSG announced their return to the PUBG Esports scene with the signing of the Spicy Fish roster.

On August 24, SSG announced a collaboration with UbiSoft to produce official Rainbow 6 merch. The merch line is based around Rainbow 6 characters and features unique printing techniques inspired by each character. It's the first collaboration of its kind for SSG.

Later the following week, on August 30, Microsoft announced the Halo Championship Series to launch Halo Infinite and included SSG as one of nine teams.

September 2 marked the announcement of Thinkingnade leaving SSG as he announced his retirement from playing professional Rainbow 6 Siege, citing no longer having a desire to play the game and pursuing a career in real estate. Thinkingnade was soon replaced by Skys on September 6.

To wrap up an eventful September, SSG announced the addition of AtomicMari to the organization as a co-owner on September 25 alongside Shaun "Shonduras" McBride, Shawn Holladay, and AtomicMari's business partner Peter Kitch.

Rainbow Six: Siege

Current roster

Tournament results

Rocket League

Current roster

Tournament results

Halo Infinite

Current Roster

Apex Legends

Current roster

Smash Ultimate

Current roster

Tournament results

iRacing

Current roster

Tournament results

Smite Pro League

Tournament results

Partnerships/Collaborations 
Spacestation Gaming has active partnerships with Raven, Champion, and Steelseries, AK racing, Scuf gaming, CHOMP

References

External links
 

Tom Clancy's Rainbow Six Siege teams
Rocket League teams
Super Smash Bros. player sponsors
World of Warcraft teams
Esports teams established in 2017
Esports teams based in the United States